{{DISPLAYTITLE:Lambda2 Fornacis}}

 
 

λ2 Fornacis, Latinized as Lambda2 Fornacis, is the primary of a binary star system in the southern constellation of Fornax. It is just visible to the naked eye as a dim, yellow-hued point of light with an apparent visual magnitude of 5.78. It is located 83 light years distant from the Sun, based on stellar parallax, and is drifting further away with a radial velocity of +12 km/s.

This object is a G-type main-sequence star with a stellar classification of G1V. It is considered a solar analog, being photometrically-similar to the Sun. The star is an estimated 4.3 billion years old with 1.2 times the mass of the Sun and 1.5 times the Sun's radius. It is radiating three times the luminosity of the Sun from its photosphere at an effective temperature of 5,936 K. The abundance of elements with more mass than helium is 55% higher than in the Sun.

This is most likely an M5–M6 class red dwarf with 0.11 times the Sun's mass.

Planetary system
Precision Doppler spectroscopy from an intensive 48 night observing campaign on the Anglo-Australian Telescope has revealed the presence of a low-mass extrasolar planet orbiting the star. This object has an orbital period of 17.24 days and an eccentricity of 0.2.

See also
 List of extrasolar planets

References

G-type main-sequence stars
Solar analogs
Planetary systems with one confirmed planet
Binary stars

Fornax (constellation)
Fornacis, Lambda2
Durchmusterung objects
016417
012186
0772
J02365859-3434404